Rothia rhaeo is a moth of the family Noctuidae first described by Herbert Druce in 1894. This moth occurs in Madagascar, Uganda and in South Africa.

This species has a wingspan of 35 mm.

References
 Africanmoths - distribution map

Agaristinae
Moths of Madagascar
Insects of Uganda
Moths of Africa
Moths described in 1894